Francis Tam Pak Yuen (born May 1949) was the incumbent Secretary for Economy and Finance of Macau in 1999–2014.

Education
Born in Macau, Tam obtained a British Senior diploma in business management, a diploma in Law of China, and a bachelor's degree in business administration from the University of East Asia.

Business career
Prior to his current position, Tam was in the business of textiles with positions such as general manager of the Lun Hap Garment Factory
and deputy director of the Macao Association of Manufacturers. He has held positions with various trade and business related entities including the board of directors of Macao's Chinese Chamber of Commerce and executive member of the All-China Federation of Industry and Commerce.

Pro-China causes and Chinese political memberships
 Member of the Guangdong Provincial People's Political Consultative Conference
 Council member of the China Overseas Friendship Association
 Council Member of China Association for Promotion of Glorious Cause
 Member of the 9th National Committee of the Chinese People's Consultative Conference
 Member of the Preparatory Committee of the MSAR
 Member of the Selection Committee of the MSAR

References
 Information on the major officials and the Procurator-General of the MSAR

1949 births
Living people
Macau people
University of Macau alumni
Government ministers of Macau
Members of the 9th Chinese People's Political Consultative Conference
Members of the 10th Chinese People's Political Consultative Conference
Members of the 11th Chinese People's Political Consultative Conference
Members of the 12th Chinese People's Political Consultative Conference